Geoffrey Hutchinson (29 August 1933 – 3 July 2021) was a Barbadian cricketer. He played in two first-class cricket matches for Barbados in 1955/56.

See also
 List of Barbadian representative cricketers

References

External links
 

1933 births
2021 deaths
Barbadian cricketers
Barbados cricketers
People from Saint Michael, Barbados